Nebria ambigua is a species of black coloured ground beetle in the  Nebriinae subfamily that is endemic to Tajikistan.

References

ambigua
Beetles described in 1902
Beetles of Asia
Endemic fauna of Tajikistan